Michael Denis Biddiss (born 1942) is emeritus professor of history at the University of Reading. He specialises in the history of the development of racist ideology, and the history of medicine.

Early life
Michael Denis Biddiss was born in 1942.

Career
Biddiss was formerly with Downing College, University of Cambridge. He has been professor of history at the University of Reading since 1979 (emeritus since 2004), and was dean of letters and social sciences from 1982 to 1985. He was president of the Historical Association from 1991 to 1994. He specialises in the history of the development of racist ideology.

Selected publications
 The age of the masses: Ideas and society in Europe since 1870. Penguin, 1977.  
 Father of racist ideology: The social and political thought of Count Gobineau. Weybright & Talley, New York, 1970. 
 Gobineau: Selected political writings. Jonathan Cape, London, 1970. (Editor and introduction) (Roots of the Right series) 
 Thatcherism: Personality and politics. Macmillan, Basingstoke, 1987. (Edited with	Kenneth R. Minogue) 
 Images of race. Leicester University Press, Leicester, 1979. (Editor) 
 The uses and abuses of antiquity. Peter Lang, 1999. (Editor with Maria Wyke) 
 Themes in modern European history, 1890-1945. Routledge, 2009. (Edited with Nicholas Atkin)
 The Wiley-Blackwell dictionary of modern European history since 1789. Wiley-Blackwell, 2011. (Edited with Nicholas Atkin and Frank Tallett)

References 

Academics of the University of Cambridge
1942 births
British historians
Historians of fascism
Academics of the University of Reading
Living people